The Bar Lake site, also designated 20AR437 , is an archaeological site located in Alger County, Michigan. The site dates from the Woodland period, and is located along the Indian River about 40 feet from the water and 1 km from the Widewaters site. It is located near a stand of wild rice. It was listed on the National Register of Historic Places in 2014.

References

Further reading

Geography of Alger County, Michigan
Archaeological sites on the National Register of Historic Places in Michigan
National Register of Historic Places in Alger County, Michigan